Starr Status is the debut album by rapper Kenn Starr, released August 29, 2006 on Halftooth Records. The album features production from Starr's fellow Low Budget Crew members Kev Brown and Oddisee, as well as Illmind, Khrysis and DJ Roddy Rod. Album guests include Talib Kweli, Asheru, Supastition, Median and Darien Brockington. The album features the single "Against the Grain" b/w "Waitin' on You"/"Back at it Again", and the bonus track "If", Starr's 2004 debut single.

Reviews 

Starr Status was met with mixed reviews from critics. JIVE Magazine praised the album, granting a 4 Star rating, stating "there shouldn’t be any argument over Kenn Starr’s status as one of thee best MCs in the game." AllHipHop.com writer Andrew Kameka commented "Starr Status remains strong thanks to his wit and exceptional delivery. His natural, almost effortless ability to wrap words around any beat placed before him makes this a memorable collection."

RapReviews.com writer Andrew Matson gave the album a humble rating, saying "he needs to hold himself to a much higher standard if he wants to make good on his potential to be a clever, emotional, mature emcee with technical skills"..."Starr Status is, to me, a frustrating listen because of what it could have been." Okayplayer.com writer Adam Roussell gave the album a moderate 3 Star rating, and criticized Starr Status for a lack of introspection, stating "Anyone who listens to Starr Status is likely to be entertained, but they are unlikely to be endeared to the artist.  And that’s vital in this era where a star’s status is often gauged by the number of people who are compelled by the artist’s story."

Track listing

Album singles

Personnel
 Recording engineer: Oddisee, Kev Brown
 Mixing: Illmind, Oddisee, Kev Brown, DJ Roddy Rod, M-Phazes, Dave "Superstar" Dar
 Mastering: Tom Brick
 Executive producer: David Schrager, Kenn Starr
 Photography: Jati Lindsay
 Art direction & design: Heinz

References

2006 albums
Hip hop albums by American artists
Albums produced by Khrysis
Albums produced by Illmind